(Treacherous love), BWV203, is a secular cantata composed  by Johann Sebastian Bach in Köthen between 1718 and 1719, while he was in the service of the court of Leopold, Prince of Anhalt-Köthen. Bach wrote the unusual work on an Italian libretto for a bass soloist and harpsichord.

Background 
After an extended period at the court of Weimar, Bach was Kapellmeister at the court of Leopold, Prince of Anhalt-Köthen between 1717 and 1723, directing a qualified musical ensemble. As the court was Reformed, he had no obligations to compose church music, but focused on instrumental works. He had no choir at his disposition, but several excellent singers who sometimes stayed for a short period. He later wrote about this period:

History and text 
Bach composed this cantata in Köthen in 1718 or 1719 for an unknown occasion. Its librettist and first performance are also unknown. Unusually for Bach, the text is Italian; only one other cantata (BWV 209) has Italian text. The text is very similar to the text of a cantata by Nicola Fago.

The composition of Amore traditore may have been prompted by the visit of Johann Gottfried Riemschneider, a famous bass, at the court in Köthen in 1718-19. Bach wrote a work to entertain, and to showcase two musicians, the singer and a virtuoso harpsichordist.

Scoring and structure 
The cantata is based on the Italian solo cantata tradition. It is structured in three movements, alternating arias and a connecting recitative, and scored for a solo bass and keyboard (and possibly cello or viola da gamba).
 Aria: 
 Recitative: 
 Aria:

Music 
The first aria includes a flowing bass line and strong ritornello theme. The movement is in da capo form and features long melismas and a very high vocal range. The secco recitative is short but not harmonically cohesive. The final movement is also a da capo aria, with three lines of counterpoint and a complex keyboard part.

Recordings 
Jacques Villisech, Gustav Leonhardt. J. S. Bach: Cantatas BWV 203 & BWV 209. Telefunken, 1964.
Amsterdam Baroque Orchestra & Choir, Ton Koopman Bach: Complete Cantatas, Vol. 2.  Erato, 1995
Klaus Mertens, Ton Koopman. Ton Koopman Plays Bach. Naxos, 2000.
Dominik Wörner, il Gardellino. Solo Cantatas for Bass. Passacaille 2013.
Bach Collegium Japan, Masaaki Suzuki, Dominik Wörner. Bach Secular cantatas Vol. 7. BIS SACD.

Notes

References

Cited sources

External links 
 Amore traditore, BWV 203: performance by the Netherlands Bach Society (video and background information)
 
 BWV 203 – "Amore traditore": English translation, Emmanuel Music
 
 
 BWV 203 Amore traditore: English translation, University of Vermont
 BWV 203 Amore traditore: text, scoring, University of Alberta 
 Johann Sebastian Bach (1685–1750) / Cantata BWV 203 "Amore traditore" Breitkopf & Härtel

Secular cantatas by Johann Sebastian Bach
1710s works